Meuffelsia is a genus of flies in the family Dolichopodidae. It is named after Henk Meuffels, a Dutch researcher of the family. It is known from South Africa.

Species
Meuffelsia manningi Grichanov, 2008
Meuffelsia erasmusorum Grichanov, 2008

References 

Peloropeodinae
Dolichopodidae genera
Diptera of Africa
Endemic insects of South Africa